Kees Luijckx (born 11 February 1986) is a Dutch former professional footballer who played as a centre-back. He earned 7 caps with the Netherlands U21 youth team.

Club career
Born in Beverwijk, North Holland. Luijckx began his career in his hometown Castricum with Vitesse 1922 before being scouted AZ in 1996. He initially played for the youth side and was then promoted to AZ's first team in the Eredivisie. Having made one league appearance in a year, he was loaned out to S.B.V. Excelsior in July 2007. He left Excelsior after only two games in the season 2007–2008 and returned to AZ, where he played 15 matches in the 2008–2009 season and won the 2008–09 Eredivisie. On 26 May 2009, his club announced they were planning without him and he would be searching a new club.

In January 2010, Luijckx signed a three-year contract with NAC Breda joining the club in July 2010.

In 2015, he joined Videoton, Hungary's reigning champion.

On 20 September 2015, Luijckx, who was a free agent, signed a half-year contract with Danish Superliga-side SønderjyskE. In January 2020, he joined Silkeborg IF on a contract for the rest of the season.

On 17 July 2020, Luijckx returned to Roda JC Kerkrade on a one-year contract.

International career
Luijckx was part of the Dutch Olympic side participating in the Beijing 2008 Olympics. He played as a substitute in the pre-Olympic ING Cup in Hong Kong, arriving in the second half for the injured Kew Jaliens.

Career statistics

Club

Notes
1 Includes KNVB Cup.
2 Includes UEFA Champions League and UEFA Europa League matches.
3 Includes the Johan Cruijff Shield, Eredivisie playoffs, and Danish Superliga championship playoff matches.

References

External links
 
 Holland stats at OnsOranje
 Kees Luijckx Interview

1986 births
Living people
People from Castricum
Association football defenders
Dutch footballers
Dutch expatriate footballers
Netherlands under-21 international footballers
Footballers at the 2008 Summer Olympics
Olympic footballers of the Netherlands
Eredivisie players
Super League Greece players
Nemzeti Bajnokság I players
Danish Superliga players
AZ Alkmaar players
Excelsior Rotterdam players
ADO Den Haag players
NAC Breda players
Roda JC Kerkrade players
Fehérvár FC players
Niki Volos F.C. players
SønderjyskE Fodbold players
Silkeborg IF players
Dutch expatriate sportspeople in Greece
Dutch expatriate sportspeople in Hungary
Dutch expatriate sportspeople in Denmark
Expatriate footballers in Greece
Expatriate footballers in Hungary
Expatriate men's footballers in Denmark
Footballers from North Holland